Yacine Diallo (born October 18, 1897 in Labé, Guinea, and died April 14, 1954 in Conakry) was a politician from Guinea who served in the French National Assembly from 1946 to 1954.

References
 1st page on the French National Assembly website
 2nd page on the French National Assembly website

1897 births
1954 deaths
People from Labé Region
People of French West Africa
Guinean politicians
French Section of the Workers' International politicians
Members of the Constituent Assembly of France (1945)
Members of the Constituent Assembly of France (1946)
Deputies of the 1st National Assembly of the French Fourth Republic
Deputies of the 2nd National Assembly of the French Fourth Republic